El jefe máximo ("The Supreme Leader") is a 1940 Mexican film. It was directed by Fernando de Fuentes.

External links
 

1940 films
1940s Spanish-language films
Films directed by Fernando de Fuentes
Mexican black-and-white films
Mexican comedy films
Mexican drama films
1940 comedy-drama films
1940s Mexican films